Tombonuwo (Tambonuo) is a Paitanic language spoken in the Pitas and Labuk-Sugut Districts of northwest Sabah, Malaysia.

Phonology

Consonants 

The phonemes  are voiceless. All other expressions are voiced.

Vowels 

 is often pronounced as unrounded .

Morphology

Focus 
Sabahan languages are characterized by "focus" morphology, which marks a syntactic relationship between the predicate of a clause and the "focused" noun phrase of the clause (see Austronesian alignment).

Tombonuwo has four focus categories, conventionally labelled "actor", "patient", "referent" and "theme". Focus is marked by affixation on the verb.
 Actor: -um- / m(u)-
 Patient: -on (Present tense) / -∅ (Past tense)
 Referent: -an
 Theme: i-

Tense and aspect 
The only marked tense in Tombonuwo is past tense.
 Past tense: n- (-in-)
 Stative: o-
 Perfective: ko-
 Non-volitional past tense: n-o-
 Accomplishment: n-o-ko-

Demonstratives 
 Near the speaker: 
 Far from the speaker: 
 Medium distance from the speaker:

References

Paitanic languages
Languages of Malaysia
Endangered Austronesian languages